The Railway Safety Regulator (RSR) is an agency of the government of South Africa, headquartered in Midrand, Johannesburg that regulates railway safety.

The agency oversees railway safety, conducts audits and inspections and investigates accidents and incidents related to railways.

The National Railway Safety Regulator Act No. 16 of 2002 established the RSR.

The RSR’s oversight role begins before the first train leaves the station. To operate on the South African rail network, train operators must apply to the RSR for a safety permit, demonstrating that they meet prescribed operational requirements.

Affairs
The RSR's Head Office is situated at Building 4, Waterfall Point Office Park in Midrand, Johannesburg Metropolitan Municipality. Building 2 in the same complex houses the central region office of the RSR. The RSR has other regional offices in Cape Town (Long Street Building) and Durban (Embassy Building).

It previously had its head office in Waterview Corner in Bruma, Johannesburg Municipality; and later in the Lake Buena Vista Building in Centurion, Tshwane Municipality. It formerly had its Cape Town office in the Paul Sauer Building.

See also

Train accidents in South Africa:
 Blackheath train accident
 Pretoria train accident
 Hennenman–Kroonstad train crash
Other South African accident investigation agencies:
 South African Civil Aviation Authority - investigates aviation accidents

References

External links
 Railway Safety Regulator
2009/2010 Annual Report (Archive)

Government agencies of South Africa
Rail transport in South Africa
Rail accident investigators
Railway safety